Gahjae is a class of semi-submersible fast torpedo boat operated by the Navy of the Islamic Revolutionary Guard Corps of Iran.

History 
Allegedly originating from the North Korea as Taedong-C, there are reports suggesting that three boats of this class were delivered to Iran on 22 December 2002.

Design 
The appearance of these vessels, resembles those of Peykaap-class and they should be close in terms of dimension. The vessels can carry two lightweight torpedoes of unknown type.

According to Jane's Fighting Ships, the vessel is likely designed for a high-speed approach towards enemy on the surface, and then submerging for almost  before using the snort mast for an attack, like Kajami-class.

References 

Fast patrol boat classes of the Navy of the Islamic Revolutionary Guard Corps
Semi-submersibles
Torpedo boat classes
Iran–North Korea military relations